Doncho Donev (Bulgarian: Дончо Донев; born 24 January 1967) is a retired Bulgarian professional footballer who played as a forward for several clubs and the Bulgarian national team. Donev is the current president of the Bulgarian Football Players' Association.

Career
Donev began his career playing for FC Dimitrovgrad, before spells with CSKA Sofia, Lokomotiv Sofia and Levski Sofia. In August 1996, he moved to Turkey to play for Sarıyer G.K., Vanspor, Çanakkale Dardanelspor and Denizlispor in the Süper Lig.

Donev received three caps for the Bulgaria national football team, first appearing in a friendly against Turkey on 26 August 1992.

Honours

Club
CSKA Sofia
 Bulgarian A Group (2): 1988–89, 1989–90
 Bulgarian Cup (2): 1987–88, 1988–89
 Cup of the Soviet Army (2): 1988–89, 1989–90

Lokomotiv Sofia
 Bulgarian Cup: 1994–95

Levski Sofia
 Bulgarian Cup: 1997–98

References

External links 
 Profile at LevskiSofia.info

1967 births
Living people
Bulgarian footballers
Bulgaria international footballers
FC Dimitrovgrad players
PFC CSKA Sofia players
Botev Plovdiv players
FC Lokomotiv 1929 Sofia players
PFC Levski Sofia players
PFC Lokomotiv Plovdiv players
Sarıyer S.K. footballers
Vanspor footballers
Dardanelspor footballers
Denizlispor footballers
Expatriate footballers in Turkey
Bulgarian expatriate sportspeople in Turkey
First Professional Football League (Bulgaria) players
Association football forwards
People from Dimitrovgrad, Bulgaria
Sportspeople from Haskovo Province